Paradise Valley is a section of the Tamraght River valley in the Moroccan High Atlas mountains.

Name and location 
The valley is named since it is often locally likened to a “paradise on earth”. It is also called Tamraght river valley after the name of the surrounding region.

The valley is located approximately 35 km north of the city of Agadir.

Biodiversity 
The valley is in the middle of the region of Imouzzar which is known for its broad biodiversity. It includes trees of palm, banana, olive and fig. The valley has numerous small waterfalls and cascades and rocky pools.

Gallery

References

External links 

 The Valley of the Hippies in Morocco
 Agadir Paradise Valley

Geography of Souss-Massa